At the 1924 Summer Olympics, seven fencing events were contested. A women's event, the individual foil, was held for the first time.

Scoring controversy
After the games, an Italian and a Hungarian settled a scoring controversy with a real duel. Aldolfo Contronei, described in some sources as a 45-year-old fencing critic for an Italian newspaper and others as the captain of the Italian foil team, fought Giorgio Santelli, the 27-year-old son of the Hungarian Olympic team's coach Italo Santelli. Giorgio Santelli had invoked the Code Duello in order to fight in the place of his 60-year-old father. The duel was fought in the town of Abbazia near the Hungarian border with heavy sabers. The duel was terminated after only two minutes of combat time when Santelli must have landed a tierce of quarte in the side of Contronei's forehead.

A further duel resulted when Gyorgy Kovacs, a Hungarian judge at the Games also involved in the causes of the earlier duel, fought one of the Italian team, Oreste Puliti, four months after the Games over allegations made by Kovacs and other judges.

Medal summary

Men's events

Women's events

Participating nations

A total of 240 fencers from 23 nations competed at the Paris Games:

  (men:13 women:0)
  (men:5 women:0)
  (men:19 women:0)
  (men:1 women:0)
  (men:6 women:0)
  (men:7 women:0)
  (men:7 women:4)
  (men:3 women:0)
  (men:20 women:4)
  (men:16 women:4)
  (men:6 women:0)
  (men:9 women:1)
  (men:19 women:0)
  (men:14 women:3)
  (men:4 women:0)
  (men:4 women:1)
  (men:10 women:0)
  (men:13 women:0)
  (men:6 women:3)
  (men:7 women:3)
  (men:1 women:0)
  (men:19 women:2)
  (men:6 women:0)

Medal table

References

 
1924 Summer Olympics events
1924
1924 in fencing
International fencing competitions hosted by France